Parliamentary elections were held in Norway on 13 September 2021. All 169 seats in the Norwegian legislature, the Storting, were up for election. The election was won by a coalition consisting of the social-democratic Labour Party and the agrarian Centre Party that entered into negotiations to form a government. The election also resulted in a majority for the parties that seek to dissolve the unpopular and controversial Viken county.

It saw a big win for the left-wing opposition in an election fought on climate change, inequality, and oil. Late at night on 13 September, incumbent Conservative Party prime minister Erna Solberg conceded defeat. Her party ended up with the second-largest number of representatives. Jonas Gahr Støre's Labour Party retained its position as Norway's largest party and expanded their lead in seats over the Conservatives, despite a slight drop in its share of votes and the loss of one seat.

Støre was aiming to form a majority government with the Centre Party and the Socialist Left Party, but the latter stated they would remain in opposition citing disagreements over climate and welfare policies, while remaining open for future negotiations and to support the government on common grounds. On 14 October, Støre became prime minister of a pro-oil minority government, the Støre Cabinet.

Background

2017 parliamentary election and aftermath 

In the 2017 parliamentary election held on 11 September, Erna Solberg of the Conservatives retained her position as prime minister after four years in power. Her premiership additionally received the support of the Progress Party, the Liberals, and the Christian Democrats, who combined secured 88 of the 169 seats in parliament. The opposition, led by Jonas Gahr Støre and his Labour Party, won 81 seats. Other opposition parties included the Centre Party, Socialist Left, the Greens, and the Red Party.

Christian Democratic Party government accession 
The Christian Democrats voted at a party conference to join Solberg's government on 2 November 2018 and on 16 January 2019, Solberg's Conservatives struck a deal with the Christian Democratic Party. This marked the first time since 1985 that Norway would have a majority government representing right-wing parties in the Storting.

Progress Party withdrawal from government 
On 20 January 2020, the Progress Party decided to withdraw from the government due to a decision by Solberg to repatriate a woman linked to Islamic State and her children back to Norway. Despite this, Solberg said that she and her party would continue to head a minority government, and the other parties in the coalition (the Christian Democrats and the Liberals) have also stated they would continue to serve in it.

Electoral system 

The election used party-list proportional representation in nineteen multi-member constituencies. The number of members to be returned from each constituency varies between 4 and 19. To determine the apportionment of the 169 seats amongst the 19 counties, a two-tier formula is used, based on population and geographic size. Each inhabitant counts one point, while each square kilometer counts 1.8 points.

A total of 150 of the seats are regular district seats. These are awarded based on the election results in each county, and are unaffected by results in other counties. Nineteen of the seats (one for each county) are leveling seats, awarded to parties who win fewer seats than their share of the national popular vote otherwise entitles them to. A modification of the Sainte-Lague method, where the first quotient for each party is calculated using a divisor of 1.4 instead of 1, is used to allocate both the constituency and leveling seats. A party must win 4% of the popular vote in order to win compensation seats but may still win district seats even if it fails to reach this threshold. The system for apportioning seats is biased in favour of rural areas since the area of the county is a factor, but the system of compensation seats reduces the effect this has on final party strength.

Electoral reform 
On 21 June 2017, Solberg's Cabinet established a committee tasked with reviewing the electoral system used in Norwegian parliamentary elections. The 17-member committee, which was led by court judge , published its report on the electoral system on 27 May 2020. The committee agreed that the number of seats should remain at 169. Furthermore, a majority of the committee favoured the retention of the current 19 constituencies, lowering the electoral threshold to 3% and the abolition of the two-tier formula for the apportionment of seats; however, the proposed reforms to the electoral law are planned to be implemented in 2022, meaning that they would only apply from the next parliamentary election in 2025. The reform of the counties and municipalities came into effect on 1 January 2021 and resulted in a reduction in the number of counties from 19 to 11; the 19 constituencies no longer correspond to the county boundaries.

Date 
As the 2017 election was held on 11 September, the 2021 election was to be held on 13 September. According to the Constitution of Norway, parliamentary elections must be held every four years. The Norwegian parliament may not be dissolved before such a parliamentary four-year term has ended, which in practice makes snap elections impossible.

Political parties

Opinion polls

Results

By electoral district 
Below is the percentage of vote each party earned in each electoral district.

Below is the number of district seats for each party, with the party winning the most votes coloured in. The party earning the leveling seat in each district is marked by (*).

By municipality

Aftermath 
After the announcement of the results, Conservative Party prime minister Erna Solberg conceded defeat to opposition leader Jonas Gahr Støre. Solberg thanked her supporters and said she was proud of the government's achievements throughout eight years of centre-right rule. On her way to the podium to deliver her concession speech, Solberg told reporters that she had called Jonas Gahr Støre, the head of the Labour Party, to congratulate him on his victory. Addressing a crowd shortly after Solberg conceded, Støre said: "We have waited, we have hoped and worked so hard, and now we can finally say, we did it."

International reactions 
International news outlets commented that following the elections, all five Nordic countries, namely Denmark, Finland, Iceland, Norway, and Sweden, now had left-leaning prime ministers or were to be ruled by left-wing-led governments simultaneously for the first time since 1959.

Disestablishment of Viken 
The parties that seek to dissolve the unpopular and controversial Viken county, formed in 2020 by the forced merger of Akershus, Buskerud, and Østfold, won a majority, and as a result the county executive initiated the formal process to dissolve the county and divide it back into its original constituent counties.

Government formation 
Government pre-negotiations took place at Hurdalsjøen Hotel in Hurdal municipality after Trygve Slagsvold Vedum and the Centre Party opted for pre-negotiations with the Socialist Left Party before subsequent government negotiations. These negotiations began on 23 September and lasted until 29 September (excluding the weekend), when the Socialist Left Party, led by Audun Lysbakken, withdrew from negotiations citing their disagreement with the Labour Party and the Centre Party, in particular over issues of petroleum and welfare. To the press, he reassured that the party was open for future negotiations and would be going into opposition for the time being. At a press conference later that day, along with Vedum, Støre announced that the Labour Party and the Centre Party had started negotiations for a minority government. On 8 October, Støre and Vedum announced that the new government's platform would be presented on 13 October and that they were ready to form a government, which was formalized for 14 October, and the Støre Cabinet was formed that day.

As a minority coalition, the government has to rely on opposition parties to pass budget motions. For both the 2021 and 2022 budgets, the government was able to come to an agreement with the Socialist Left Party.

See also 
 2021 Icelandic parliamentary election
 2021 Norwegian Sámi parliamentary election

Notes

References

2020s elections in Norway
Norway
Parliamentary
General elections in Norway
Parliamentary